, Latin for Saviour of the World, is a subject in iconography depicting Christ with his right hand raised in blessing and his left hand holding an orb (frequently surmounted by a cross), known as a . The latter symbolizes the Earth, and the whole composition has strong eschatological undertones.

Background
The theme was made popular by Northern painters such as Jan van Eyck, Hans Memling, and Albrecht Dürer. There are also several versions of the theme attributed to Titian, notably the one in the Hermitage Museum.

One painting of the subject, simply titled , was attributed or reattributed to Leonardo da Vinci in 2011. This painting disappeared from 1763 until 1900 when it was acquired from Sir Charles Robinson. It was at the time thought to be a work by Leonardo's follower, Bernardino Luini, and was purchased for the Doughty House in Richmond, London by Sir Francis Cook. By this time Christ's face and hair had been extensively repainted. A photograph taken in 1912 records the work's altered appearance. In 2017, this painting sold at auction for US$450,300,000, the highest price ever paid for a painting.

Arts
 is represented as a central motif in artworks since the 15th century such as:

See also 
Christ Pantocrator
He's Got the Whole World in His Hands (song)

References

External links

Details on de Ganay's Salvator Mundi

Iconography of Jesus
Latin religious words and phrases